No Kiseki, or Super Session (released in 1969) is the second album by the Japanese psychedelic band The Jacks. After the groups more acclaimed work Vacant World, Super Session went in a new direction, more tailored to the 1960s Japanese pop scene. Though internationally obscure, the release is still in print by Toshiba/EMI Japan.

Track listing

"Joe's Rock" - 3:13
"Into Sea Foam" - 3:37
"Rock for Fallin' Angel" - 4:23
"Jailbirds" - 2:52
"To Love You" - 0:17
"Dm4-50" - 1:18
"Flower" - 5:53
"Catch You" - 2:48
"Roll over Yuranosuke" - 3:07
"How to Love" - 2:10
"Battlefield in My Head" - 3:49

References
http://www.hmv.co.jp/news/newsDetail.asp?newsnum=308260016

1968 albums
Jacks (band) albums
EMI Records albums